Methyl dimethyldithiocarbamate is the organosulfur compound with the formula (CH3)2NC(S)SCH3.  It is the one of simplest dithiocarbamic esters.  It is a white volatile solid that is poorly soluble in water but soluble in many organic solvents.  It was once used as a pesticide.

Methyl dimethyldithiocarbamate can be prepared by methylation of salts of dimethyldithiocarbamate:
(CH3)2NCS2Na  +  (CH3O)2SO2   →   (CH3)2NC(S)SCH3  +  Na[CH3OSO3]

It can also be prepared by the reaction of a tetramethylthiuram disulfide with methyl Grignard reagents:	
[(CH3)2NC(S)S]2  +  CH3MgBr   →   (CH3)2NC(S)SCH3  +  (CH3)2NCS2MgBr

References

Dithiocarbamates